Planica (also known as Dolina pod Poncami) is an alpine valley in northwestern Slovenia known for its ski jumping hills. It may also refer to:

Places 
Planica, Kranj, a settlement in the Municipality of Kranj, Slovenia
Planica, Rače–Fram, a settlement in the Municipality of Rače–Fram, Slovenia
Planica (Brod Moravice), a settlement in the Municipality of Brod Moravice, Primorje–Gorski Kotar County, Croatia

Sport complex
Planica Nordic Center, a Nordic skiing complex in Planica, Slovenia

Music
Planica, Planica, a 1979 Slovenian song by the Avsenik Brothers Ensemble

Company
Sladoled Planica, a brand of ice cream produced by the Slovene dairy Ljubljanske Mlekarne